Sumbar may refer to:
 Sumbar River, a river in southern Turkmenistan
 Šumbar Lake, a series of lakes in Karlovac County, Croatia
 Abbreviation for Sumatera Barat, Indonesian for West Sumatra